Eland is a surname. Notable people with the surname include:

Ivan Eland, American defense analyst and author
John Eland (chemist), British chemist and Fellow of the Royal Society
John Eland (MP) (died 1542), English politician
Ronald Eland, Canadian commercial helicopter pilot
William Ronald Eland (1923-2003), South African weightlifter